James Teague Mooring (14 October 191720 October 2007) was an Australian rules footballer in the Victorian Football League (VFL).

Early life

Mooring, the son of James Wilfred Mooring and Ellen Adelaide Mooring, nee Teague, was originally from Piangil (near Swan Hill).

Mooring was a natural sportsman. His sporting talents extended also to tennis, cricket, billiards and golf.

Searching for work Mooring moved to Creswick and played with Maryborough in the Bendigo Football League.

VFL career

A chance encounter with then  coach Brighton Diggins in Creswick, signed him to the Blues. He was judged Carlton's Best First Year Player in 1940, Most Consistent Player at the club in 1941, Best and Fairest in 1942 and 2nd Best and Fairest in 1944 as well as Best Clubman in 1943.

Mooring was Vice-captain in 1942 and 1943, and club leading goalkicker in 1944.

Mooring was a member of Carlton's 1945 premiership side in a game that was referred to simply as "The Bloodbath". Mooring kicked 2 goals. 
He missed out on playing in the 1947 premiership because of injury. Mooring latter career was riddled with injuries to his knee, shoulder and hand.

Mooring was Life Member of the Blues, died in Bendigo on 20 October 2007.

In April 2014, Mooring was posthumously named as one of Carlton's 150 Greatest Players.

References

 Jim Mooring at Blueseum

1917 births
2007 deaths
Australian rules footballers from Victoria (Australia)
Carlton Football Club players
Carlton Football Club Premiership players
John Nicholls Medal winners
Maryborough Football Club players
One-time VFL/AFL Premiership players